The Bogotá Philharmonic Orchestra is the most important symphony orchestra in Colombia. It is a project maintained by the city of Bogotá and its Secretary Office of Culture, Recreation and Sport. Founded in 1967, it regularly performs at the Concert Halls of the Universidad Nacional de Colombia, the Leon de Greiff Auditorium, and the Jorge Tadeo Lozano University, the Fabio Lozano Auditorium, also at the Jorge Eliécer Gaitán Theater and the Teatro Mayor Julio Mario Santo Domingo

The orchestra currently has the swedish conductor Joachim Gustafsson as its music director. Former conductors includes the Spanish Josep Caballe-Domenech, the Brazilian conductor Ligia Amadio, the Israeli composer and conductor Lior Shambadal, the New York native conductor Irwin Hoffman, the Chilean conductor Francisco Retting, and two Mexican conductors: Eduardo Diazmuñoz and Enrique Diemecke.

The orchestra counts over 100 musicians and over 140 public performances a year, also recognized by the Latin Grammy in 2008.  
In the city's effort to establish itself as region leader for culture and the arts, the Bogotá Philharmonic extends its functions as classical orchestra to include the promotion and support of multiple music, dance and theater events, including world known Rock al Parque and related series of acts such as Opera al Parque, Jazz al Parque, Hip Hop al Parque, Dance Festivals and Theater Festivals.

Notes

External links
 Official website (in Spanish)

Colombian orchestras
Musical groups established in 1967
Music in Bogotá
Colombian culture
1967 establishments in Colombia